Llanstadwell is a small village, parish and community in south Pembrokeshire, Wales, on the north bank of the River Cleddau between Milford Haven and Neyland.

The community of Llanstadwell includes the settlements of Hazelbeach, Mascle Bridge (or Mastlebridge), Jordanston, Waterston, Scoveston and Little Honeyborough.

The population as of the 2011 UK Census was 905.

Name
The name derives from the dedication of the parish and church to St Tudwal, a 6th-century Breton monk.

History
Llanstadwell was in the cantref of Rhos, in the 16th century becoming the Hundred of Roose, but there are some ancient British sites within the present-day parish. The parish appears on a 1578 parish map of Pembrokeshire.

The administrative parish of Llanstadwell originally included Neyland which, at the start of the 20th century had grown enough to have its own council. The ecclesiastical parish of Llanstadwell still includes Neyland, whose St Clement's Church is a daughter church to Llanstadwell.

Worship
The parish of Llanstadwell extends from the shore of the Cleddau as far north as Rosemarket and is largely rural with a few scattered hamlets. The parish church is dedicated to St Tudwal, and the area includes other places of worship at Little Honeyborough, Neyland (four chapels and a Roman Catholic church) and Waterston.

St Tudwal's is believed to date from the 12th century, and the bells from 1684, but much of the present church is mid-19th century.

Music Festival
St Tudwal's Church established a music festival in 2013.

Governance
The community has a community council and is part of the Neyland West Electoral ward of Pembrokeshire County Council. The community includes the settlements of Hazelbeach, Mascle Bridge (or Mastlebridge), Jordanston, Waterston and Little Honeyborough.

Further reading
Hughes, B.H.J. Jottings on the History of South Pembrokeshire: Llanstadwell Parish, pre 1900.  (online)

References

External links

Community Council
Historical information and sources on GENUKI

Villages in Pembrokeshire
Communities in Pembrokeshire